Uhuru Kenyatta became president following the Kenyan general election, 2013.
The following is a list of presidential trips made by Uhuru Kenyatta since assuming office.

Summary of international trips

Uhuru Kenyatta has made several foreign trips on four continents, with several visits around East Africa and Africa in particular.

2013
The following international trips were made by Uhuru Kenyatta during 2013:

2014

The following international trips were made by Uhuru Kenyatta during 2014:

2015
The following international trips were made by Uhuru Kenyatta during 2015:

2016
The following international trips were made by Uhuru Kenyatta during 2016:

2017
The following international trips were made by Uhuru Kenyatta during 2017:

2018
The following international trips were made by Uhuru Kenyatta during 2018:

2019
The following international trips were made by Uhuru Kenyatta during 2019:

2020 
The following international trips were made by Uhuru Kenyatta during 2020:

2021 
The following international trips were made by Uhuru Kenyatta during 2021:

2022 
The following international trips were made by Uhuru Kenyatta in 2022.

References

2013 in international relations
2014 in international relations
2015 in international relations
2016 in international relations
2017 in international relations
Kenyatta, Uhuru
Kenyatta, Uhuru
Foreign relations of Kenya
International presidential trips
Kenyatta, Uhuru